A light combat aircraft (LCA) is a light, multirole jet/turboprop military aircraft, commonly derived from advanced trainer designs, designed for engaging in light combat. The mission can either be in a light strike or attack missions, reconnaissance, interdiction roles or trainer roles.

Characteristics 
They are typically slower than larger multirole or strike aircraft such as the American F-18, F-15E Strike Eagle, or Russian MiG-29. Most light combat aircraft are capable only of subsonic speeds, although some are capable of reaching Mach 1+. An LCA will typically be equipped with bombs, gun pods, or short-range air-to-air missiles used for COIN or CAS missions.

Some aircraft integrate more advanced armaments such as smart bombs, air to ground missiles, ECM pods (Electronic Countermeasure), and electronic targeting systems.  However, these aircraft are usually used for self-defense or anti-hostile aircraft/helicopter missions, not for air-defense missions typically carried out by lightweight fighters. Some LCAs are capable of air-to-air combat or point air defense missions if equipped with multi-mode radar systems. Still, the majority cannot perform these missions due to their small design and limited capabilities. LCAs are often used to patrol the skies and implement border patrol or air policing.

Aircraft
Below is a list of some current examples.

See also
 Light fighter

References

Attack aircraft
Fighter aircraft
Military trainer aircraft